The Rafael Gonzalez House is an historic house in the historic center of the city of Santa Barbara, California.  Built in 1825, it is one of a small number of surviving adobe houses from the Mexican period of California history. It was designated a National Historic Landmark on April 15, 1970, and added to the National Register of Historic Places.

Description
The Gonzalez House is located north of Santa Barbara's central business district, on the south side of Laguna Street between East Canon Perdido Street and East De La Guerra Street. It is a single-story adobe structure, with seven rooms. It is built in the U-shape (with the longest part being parallel to Laguna Street) and stands on a hill, separated from both Laguna and Canon Perdido streets by garden walls. When built, it had packed-earth floors, which were tiled during restoration in the 1920s. The roof, now shingled, was historically covered in terra cotta tile.

History
The building was constructed in 1825 by Rafael Gonzalez, a landowner who in 1829 became an alcalde of Santa Barbara. At this time, Santa Barbara was a part of Mexican California. After his death, in 1866, the house was inherited by one of his daughters, Francisca Ventura Gonzalez de Ramires. She lived in the house until 1923, when it was sold out of the family.  It has seen mainly commercial uses since then.

Gallery

References

Adobe buildings and structures in California
Buildings and structures in Santa Barbara, California
Houses in Santa Barbara County, California
History of Santa Barbara County, California
Houses completed in 1825
Houses on the National Register of Historic Places in California
National Historic Landmarks in California
National Register of Historic Places in Santa Barbara County, California
1825 establishments in Alta California